The Ordovician Bald Eagle Formation is a mapped bedrock unit in central Pennsylvania, USA. It is a ridge-forming unit in the Appalachian Mountains.

Description

The Bald Eagle is defined as a gray to olive-gray and grayish-red, fine to coarse-grained crossbedded sandstone or greywacke.  A conglomeratic member, called the Lost Run Member, exists in some locations.

Depositional environment
The depositional environment of the Bald Eagle has always been interpreted as mostly terrestrial or shallow marine deposits resulting in a molasse sequence produced by the Taconic orogeny.

Fossils
Very few fossils exist in the Bald Eagle Formation, and most of them are trace fossils.  However, at the base of the formation is the Orthorynchula biostratigraphic marker bed, which contains abundant Orthorynchula brachiopods.

Age
Relative age dating of the Bald Eagle places it in the Upper Ordovician period, being deposited between 488.3 and 443.7 (±10) million years ago. It rests conformably atop the Reedsville Formation and conformably below the Juniata Formation.

Economic Uses

The Bald Eagle is a good source of road material, riprap and building stone. However, iron pyrite inclusions may lead to acidic rainwater runoff.

References

See also
Geology of Pennsylvania

Ordovician System of North America
Upper Ordovician Series
Sandstone formations of the United States
Ordovician geology of Pennsylvania
Appalachian Mountains
Cliff-formers